Baldwin Hills may refer to:

 Baldwin Hills, Los Angeles, California, a neighborhood in Los Angeles
 Baldwin Hills (mountain range), California
 Baldwin Hills (TV series)

See also
 Baldwin Hills Dam disaster